Sondra Huxtable Tibideaux is a fictional character from the 1980s television series, The Cosby Show.

Background and production
Sondra Huxtable did not appear in the pilot episode of the show. Sondra was created when Bill Cosby wanted the show to express the accomplishment of successfully raising a child (e.g. a college graduate). Sabrina LeBeauf almost missed out on the role because she is only 10 years younger (b. 1958) than Phylicia Rashad (b. 1948), who played her mother in the series. Whitney Houston was in the running to be Sondra Huxtable.

Reception
The character had been criticized for being too light skinned and not resembling the other cast members.

References

Television characters introduced in 1984
Fictional African-American people
The Cosby Show characters
Fictional characters from Brooklyn
American female characters in television